Cash is a 2007 Indian Hindi-language action thriller film directed by Anubhav Sinha. The film stars Ajay Devgn, Suniel Shetty, Ritesh Deshmukh, Zayed Khan, Esha Deol, Shamita Shetty and Dia Mirza. The film was released on 3 August 2007.

Plot 

The film begins with Dhananjay "Danny" Jhumbevalkar aka DJ (Zayed Khan) meeting Rhea, whose real name is Preeti (Ayesha Takia) on an aeroplane. They soon become friends. Danny begins to narrate a tale about a diamond. This story is actually a story from his past. He tells her about a diamond that was discovered by a South Indian miner in 1836. The miner presented this diamond to his king. The king, in turn, then gifted the diamond to a British viceroy, but during a sea voyage to Britain, the viceroy's ship was sunk. After 100 years, a fisherman found the diamond and presented it to his master. The master broke it into three pieces and distributed it among his three sons. One son lost his diamond gambling, another lost him to a general, and the last brother lost it when he was murdered. In 1994, two of these three diamonds were again recovered and housed in a Belgium museum. Still, no one knew where the third diamond was until a Gujarati diamond dealer made a call to a South Africa high commission security manager named Shanaya (Shamita Shetty). But then the dealer also lost it when some goons stole the diamond from him in a preplanned car accident. The Uncle, who is a diamond thief, arranges for his goon Angad (Suniel Shetty) to steal two of the diamonds from the Belgium museum.

Cast
 Ajay Devgn as Karan
 Suniel Shetty as Angad 
Riteish Deshmukh as Lucky
Zayed Khan as Dhananjay "Danny" "DJ" Jhumbevalkar
 Esha Deol as Pooja
 Shamita Shetty as Inspector Shanaya
 Dia Mirza as Aditi Jammwal
 Ayesha Takia as Rhea / Preeti
 Bruna Abdullah as Item Number (Special Appearance)

Reception

Critical reception
Taran Adarsh of Bollywood Hungama rated the movie 2 out of 5 saying "On the whole, CASH has style, but rests on a thin plot and that is its biggest flaw. At the box-office, the film might attract the audience in its initial weekend, but a weak script will throw a spanner". Raja Sen of Rediff.com gave the film 1.5 out of 5 saying "Cash could have been a ride -- if only they paid half as much attention to the script as they did to the title song". Andy Webster of The New York Times gave the film negative review saying "Cash, for all its flash, leaves you hungry. But not for more".

Soundtrack
The soundtrack of the film was composed by Vishal–Shekhar. The song "Raham Kare" has been penned by Panchhi Jalonvi, and all other songs were penned by Vishal Dadlani. According to the Indian trade website Box Office India, with around 12 lakh units sold, this film's soundtrack album was the year's ninth highest-selling.

References

External links
 

2007 films
2000s Hindi-language films
2007 action thriller films
2000s crime action films
2007 crime thriller films
2000s buddy films
2000s heist films
Films scored by Vishal–Shekhar
Films directed by Anubhav Sinha
Indian action thriller films
Indian crime action films
Indian crime thriller films
Indian buddy films
Indian heist films